Fresh Gear is a television program on ZDTV then known as TechTV (now known as G4) that showcased the latest in personal technology. It was hosted by Stephanie Siemiller and Chris Leary. The original hosts were Jim Louderback and Sumi Das.

Fresh Gear started to air on ZDTV after its launch in May 1998. The show aired every Wednesday at 9:30 pm. It was cancelled after the May 2004 merger of G4 and TechTV into G4techTV. G4techTV continued to make episodes until the closure of the San Francisco studios. Fresh Gear  was then aired in reruns until early December 2004.

Though Fresh Gear is gone, G4techTV Canada has recreated the show as Gadgets & Gizmos.

Product review segments were often co-hosted by the 'Lab Rats': Roger Chang, Hahn Choi, Andrew Hawn, Robert Heron, James Kim, Brett Larson and Martin Sargent.  Another show that airs on another Comcast-owned channel (G4 Media's parent company) known as Geared Up has a very similar format to Fresh Gear.

References
 IMdB
 TV.com

External links
 

G4 (American TV network) original programming
TechTV original programming
1998 American television series debuts
2004 American television series endings